The following are the records of Uzbekistan in Olympic weightlifting. Records are maintained in each weight class for the snatch lift, clean and jerk lift, and the total for both lifts by the Weightlifting Federation of the Republic of Uzbekistan.

Current records

Men

Women

Historical records

Men (1998–2018)

Women (1998–2018)

References

External links

Records
Uzbekistan
Weightlifting
Olympic weightlifting